Opendisc is an Enhanced Music CD application for enabling multimedia content when a compact disc is played on a personal computer. Opendisc asserts that its technology conforms to the Blue Book specification and does not contain copy-protection functions. However, various computer users have reported that it interferes with third-party playback and ripping applications, effectively functioning as Digital Rights Management. Since version 2.0, Opendisc embedded a direct link to a default audio player such as Windows Media Player or iTunes. Because of this, many CDs now simply feature access to a Web site of the specific artist, which features exclusive music, videos, and photo content. Like a Google alert, a user is informed of artist updates via e-mail.

References

External links
Opendisc Web Site (Currently no longer in service)
Web Archive of OpenDisc site before deletion, on 30 AUG 2011

Compact disc